Mary Hopper is an American choral conductor and music minister. She is on the faculty of the Wheaton College Conservatory of Music and served as president of the American Choral Directors Association from 2015 to 2017.

At Wheaton, where she has been on faculty since 1979, she directs the Men's Glee Club and Women's Chorale and oversees all performance studies programs and faculty. She has had both journal articles and book chapters on choral music published.

Hopper studied at the University of Iowa with Don V. Moses.

References

External links
Faculty Biography

1951 births
Living people
Women conductors (music)
Wheaton College (Illinois) faculty
21st-century American conductors (music)